The Russian Embassy School in London is a Russian international school in the Royal Borough of Kensington and Chelsea, London. As of 2015 the school has 150 students. It is operated by the Russian Ministry of Foreign Affairs.

The school accepts students from Russian diplomat families. The Russian Ambassador may decide whether or not a student not from a diplomatic family will get enrollment in the school.

It was founded in 1954, and was previously the Soviet Embassy School in London.

Notable students
 Viktor Sukhodrev (when it was the Soviet Embassy School in London)

See also
 Russians in the United Kingdom
British schools in Moscow:
 British International School
 English International School Moscow
 International School of Moscow
Anglo-American-Canadian international schools in Russia:
 Anglo-American School of Moscow
 Anglo-American School of St. Petersburg

References

External links
  Russian Embassy School in London

Educational institutions established in 1954
Private co-educational schools in London
Private schools in the Royal Borough of Kensington and Chelsea
International schools in London
Russia–United Kingdom relations
London
Soviet Union–United Kingdom relations
1954 establishments in England